Richard Karl (born September 28, 1944) is an American professional golfer who is best known as the last golf club professional to win an official PGA Tour event.

Early life 
Karl was born in Johnson City, New York. He played college golf at Florida State University. He won the Alaska State Amateur twice while stationed in the Army there.

Professional career 
Karl turned professional in 1968. He won the 1974 B.C. Open by sinking a 35-foot putt on the first hole in a playoff with Bruce Crampton. Karl, who worked at the En-Joie Golf Club in Endicott, New York where the B.C. Open was played and lived along the 10th fairway, is the last club professional to win on the PGA Tour.

Karl played briefly on the Senior PGA Tour (now Champions Tour) starting after he turned 50 in September 1994. His best finish in this venue was a T-5 at the ACE Group Classic. In 2007, Karl played as a sponsor's exemption in the inaugural Dick's Sporting Goods Open, a Champions Tour event played on his home course.

Amateur wins
1965 Alaska State Amateur
1966 Alaska State Amateur

Professional wins (6)

PGA Tour wins (1)

PGA Tour playoff record (1–0)

Other wins (5)
1972 Yuma Open (PGA Tour satellite event)
1982 Iowa PGA Championship
1983 Iowa PGA Championship
1984 Iowa PGA Championship
1985 Iowa PGA Championship

See also 

 1970 PGA Tour Qualifying School graduates

References

External links

American male golfers
Florida State Seminoles men's golfers
PGA Tour golfers
PGA Tour Champions golfers
Golfers from New York (state)
People from Johnson City, New York
Sportspeople from Binghamton, New York
1944 births
Living people